Jude (born Michael Jude Christodal, October 16, 1969, Boston, Massachusetts) is an American singer and songwriter.

History
Jude's debut album, 430 N. Harper Ave, was released independently by the Fish of Death label in 1997. Maverick signed Jude and released his second album, No One Is Really Beautiful  which contained several re-recordings of some of the debut album's tracks. Two tracks from No One Is Really Beautiful charted: "I'm Sorry Now" (#33 Billboard Adult Top 40 Chart) and "Rick James" (#29 Billboard Adult Top 40 Chart, #28 Billboard Modern Rock Chart).

The song "I Know" was featured on the multi-platinum City of Angels soundtrack. The song "I Do" from No One Is Really Beautiful was used in several television shows. During this time, Jude also toured with Alanis Morissette, Ben Folds Five, The Cranberries, Dido, Tori Amos, Better Than Ezra, Train, and Chris Isaak.

His follow-up album, King of Yesterday was released on September 11, 2001. The album featured a cover of Bread's "Everything I Own". Jude soon parted ways with Maverick and produced his subsequent albums independently (Sarah in 2004 and Redemption in 2006).

Currently, Jude is signed with Naive records in Paris, France. Naive released Redemption in Europe in September 2006, and released the single "Save Me" via iTunes in October. The whole album was released in the US in November 2006.

In 2006, Jude, Chris Seefried, Jeff Russo and Dave Gibbs formed the band Low Stars. They released an eponymous CD through the Starbucks Hear music label in 2007. The song "Calling All Friends", which appears on the album and was penned by Jude, is the theme for the ABC drama What About Brian. In August 2007, Jude left the Low Stars.

Jude is currently based in Los Angeles, writing songs for film and television. In 2015, he launched a PledgeMusic campaign to record the EP Me and My Monster, which was released in 2016.

Use in other media
 "The Way That You Want Me" and "I Know" were each featured in 2010 episodes of the television series, House 
 "Out of L.A." was featured in the premiere episode of the television series, Men of a Certain Age
 "Love, Love, Love" was featured in a 2007 episode of the television drama, What About Brian; "Stay" was featured in the last scene of the final episode of that series.
 "Crescent Height Shuffle" features on a TV advertisement for Miller Genuine Draft that was first broadcast in Ireland in May 2007.
 "Save Me" was featured in Season 4 premiere episode of The O.C., "The Avengers", and was also used as a pre-season on-line promotion. "Out of LA" was featured in a 2005 episode of the series.
 "Everything's Alright (I Think It's Time)" and "All I Wanna Do" were featured in separate episode of the television series, Alias.
 "Everything's Alright (I Think It's Time)" appeared in the film The Animal.
 "I Know" was featured on the 1998 City of Angels soundtrack.
 "I Do" has been used in several television series.
 "I Do" and "I'm Sorry Now" were featured in the television series "Dawson's Creek".
 "I Do" and "King of Yesterday" were featured in the television series Felicity.
 "King of Yesterday" was featured in the films Not Another Teen Movie and Bubble Boy.
 "Everything I Own" was featured in the pilot episode of Smallville, an episode of the television series Crossing Jordan and a season 3 episode of Roswell
 "You Mama You" and several other songs appeared in the film Barry Munday.
 "I Know" was featured in the television series "House".
 New recording of "Madonna" was featured in the season 1 finale episode of the television series Banshee

Non-album work
Jude has also done many musical works outside of his albums, among them—
 The main title theme and underscore for Bravo’s “Below Deck” series.
 The Main Title Theme and underscore for “Below Deck Mediterranean” also on Bravo.
 The Main Title Theme for “Below Deck Sailing Yacht” on Bravo.
 The Main Title Theme and underscore for “Below Deck Adventure” on Bravo 

 The main title theme for A Basement Affair on VH1
 The main title theme for ABC's Cavemen, as well as the score, with Mickey Petralia
 The main title theme ABC's What About Brian
 The songs "You All, Everybody" (with Chris Seefried) and "Funny, Now" by the fictional band Drive Shaft in the television series Lost
 The song "Pretty Liar" on the 1000 Clowns album "Freelance Bubblehead" (1999)
 Score and songs for feature film Barry Munday
 The song "Need You Here", for the television series One Tree Hill
 "All of My Friends Are On TV" as the main title theme for season 2 of VH1's Surreal Life
 The main title theme music to The Ellen Show (2001)
 The songs "Crazy" (live Gnarls Barkley cover) and "Gay Cowboy" available on Jude's web page; other songs available occasionally
 The song "Cuba" recorded for the King of Yesterday album, but forced to be left off by the record label; included in the French re-release
 The song "My Name is Death" for the film Final Destination 2
 Score for VH1's Rock of Love Bus; Daisy of Love; I Love Money; The Good Life
 Score for the CW's High Society
 The main title theme music to Ghost Mine (2013) with Shawn Rorie

Discography

Albums
 430 N. Harper Ave. (1997)
I Will Not Die – 3:06
Out of L.A. – 3:14
You Mama You – 2:20
George – 2:52
Paper Towel – 4:44
In Between 3:16
Prophet – 3:45
Life Lays Me Down / Shoes My Size – 5:26
Baby Ruth in Atlanta – 5:19
Love Letters – 3:10
Cammie – 5:19
More Than I Wanted – 4:18

 You're So Hot I Love You (EP)
Brad and Suzy (remix) – 4:05
Prophet (live) – 4:17
I'm Sorry Now (live) – 3:43
Homerun Hillary – 3:18
Out of L.A. (live) – 4:48
The Asshole Song – 4:03

 No One Is Really Beautiful (1998)
You Mama You – 2:20
Charlie Says – 4:20
I'm Sorry Now – 4:23
Rick James – 4:42
Battered Broken – 4:58
I Do – 4:50
Prophet – 4:04
Out of L.A. – 4:01
I Know – 4:34
She Gets the Feeling – 4:26
George – 3:21
Brad and Suzy – 4:37
The Asshole Song – 4:04

 King of Yesterday (2001) #47 France
King of Yesterday
Everything's Alright (I Think It's Time)
Red Room
The Not So Pretty Princess
Everything I Own
Sit Ups
Indian Lover
Oh Boy
I Do
I Will Not Die
Teenage Girlfriend
King of Yesterday (radio remix)

 Sarah (2004) #67 France
Madonna – 3:48
Perfect Plank – 3:16
You and Me – 4:39
Crescent Heights – 2:46
If You Need – 3:36
Your Love is Everything – 4:45
Living Together – 1:57
Black Superman – 4:06
Isn't It Over – 4:24

 Redemption (2006) #131 France
All I Want to Do – 4:24
Save Me – 3:53
Dreaming – 4:15
Love Love Love – 3:24
Run to My Room – 3:27
End of My Rainbow – 3:50
Your Eyes – 3:21
Breakup Song – 2:37
She's Getting Married – 4:12
Stay – 4:20
Money – 3:57
Beautiful Loser – 2:21
Fly Again – 3:12
Taking More and Giving Less (live) – 5:06

 Cuba (2008) - rarities and out-takes
Cuba
Beautiful Bleached-Out Blonde
The Rider Comes
The Rider Comes 2
In The Country
Everybody Party On The Dance Floor
Helmut Dance
One of These Days
Outside My Window
Prima Ballerina
G-Blues
My Bonnie

 Me & My Monster (2016) (EP)
Me & My Monster – 3:54
The Way That You Want Me – 3:11
Woman – 3:59
Money – 3:57
Madonna – 6:19
Moving On - 4:36

References

External links
Jude Tabs/Chords

1969 births
American male singers
Living people
Singers from Massachusetts
Songwriters from Massachusetts
Naïve Records artists
Maverick Records artists
American male songwriters